Pušenci is a settlement east of Ormož in northeastern Slovenia. The area belonged to the traditional region of Styria. It is now included in the Drava Statistical Region.

There is a small chapel with a belfry in the settlement. It was built in the early 20th century on the site of an older chapel.

References

External links
Pušenci on Geopedia

Populated places in the Municipality of Ormož